Peschel may refer to:

 Andreas Peschel (born 1962), German microbiologist
 Axel Peschel (born 1942), German cyclist
 Carl Gottlieb Peschel (1798–1879), German painter
 Falko Peschel (born 1965), German pedagogue and proponent of open learning
 Henrik Peschel (born 1967), German film director and cameraman
 Herb Peschel (1913–1986), Canadian football player
 Keewaydinoquay Peschel (1919–1999), scholar, ethnobotanist, herbalist, medicine woman, teacher and author
 Kyle Peschel (born 1979), video game producer, director and editor
 Noemi Peschel (born 2001), German rhythmic gymnast 
 Oscar Peschel (1826–1875), German geographer and amateur anthropologist
 Peter Peschel (born 1972), German football player ...
 Rudolf Peschel (1894–1944), German Generalleutnant in the Wehrmacht during World War II 
 Uwe Peschel (born 1968), German professional road bicycle racer and a time trialist

Places 
 Peschel Island